Millbrook Resort is a luxury resort near Queenstown, New Zealand.  It is located 4 kilometres to the west of the historic gold-mining town of Arrowtown.  The resort covers 650 acres of the Wakatipu Basin - a glacial valley bordered by the Crown Range, the Remarkables and Lake Wakatipu.

The resort includes five restaurants, a bar/café, a spa and a 36 hole golf course.

Millbrook is privately owned by the Ishii family, though individual residences within the resort are owned by a diverse group of investors, largely from New Zealand but also from Australia and around the world.

Millbrook Declaration
In 1995, Millbrook was the venue for a top-level meeting of Commonwealth heads of government, meeting to design a policy programme of the Commonwealth of Nations, designed to ratify the basic political membership criteria of the Commonwealth.  The programme was agreed and announced on 12 November 1995.

Demographics
Millbrook is described by Statistics New Zealand as a rural settlement. It is part of the Wakatipu Basin statistical area. 

Millbrook had a population of 123 at the 2018 New Zealand census, an increase of 36 people (41.4%) since the 2013 census, and an increase of 39 people (46.4%) since the 2006 census. There were 57 households. There were 63 males and 63 females, giving a sex ratio of 1.0 males per female, with 12 people (9.8%) aged under 15 years, 9 (7.3%) aged 15 to 29, 57 (46.3%) aged 30 to 64, and 45 (36.6%) aged 65 or older.

Ethnicities were 97.6% European/Pākehā, 4.9% Māori, 2.4% Pacific peoples, and 2.4% other ethnicities (totals add to more than 100% since people could identify with multiple ethnicities).

Although some people objected to giving their religion, 53.7% had no religion, and 46.3% were Christian.

Of those at least 15 years old, 45 (40.5%) people had a bachelor or higher degree, and 6 (5.4%) people had no formal qualifications. The employment status of those at least 15 was that 39 (35.1%) people were employed full-time, and 21 (18.9%) were part-time.

References

Resorts in New Zealand
Golf clubs and courses in New Zealand
Buildings and structures in Otago
Tourist attractions in Otago